Jørgen Hatlehol (born 18 June 1997) is a Norwegian football defender who plays for Bryne.

He came through Aalesund's youth ranks. In 2021 he played his 100th game for AaFK, cup and playoff matches included.

References

1997 births
Living people
Sportspeople from Ålesund
Norwegian footballers
Aalesunds FK players
Norwegian First Division players
Eliteserien players
Association football defenders